Ben Drew may refer to:

 Urban L. Drew (1924–2013), WWII fighter ace
 Plan B (musician) (born 1983), real name Benjamin Paul Ballance-Drew